is an anime producer, author, and lecturer. He is a co-founder and former president of the production company Gainax. He is portrayed by actor Gaku Hamada in the 2014 TV Drama Aoi Honō based on the autobiographical manga by his fellow Kazuhiko Shimamoto. He is representative director of Otaking Inc. and Cloud City Inc., as well as the founder of FREEex Inc. He also served as a part-time lecturer at the University of Tokyo's college of art and sciences and as a visiting scholar at Osaka University of Arts' character creative arts department.

Biography

Childhood
Okada was born on July 1, 1958 in Osaka, Japan. He has written several Japanese-language books on otaku culture, and lectured on the topic as an adjunct instructor at University of Tokyo from 1996 to 1997. He is considered the foremost authority on otaku and in addition, in a tribute to his own otaku-ness<ref>"In those days, we didn't have the word "otaku" yet, but my first impression of Okada was, Here's a geek if I've ever seen one.''' With his girly long hair and his freakishly excited way of speaking, all I could think was, This guy is exactly like me? pg 31, Takeda 2005</ref> has been crowned "OtaKing" amongst his colleagues and fellow otaku.

University, Daicon Film and General Products
Okada was admitted to Osaka Electro-Communication University to learn to use computer in 1978, but he could not obtain any credits in the first year because he had forgotten to hand in his course registration form. For this reason, he stopped completing all the courses necessary for a university degree, and he joined a group of SF fans and went into its activity. He lived on a monthly allowance from his parents who did not know of his dropping out. In the same year, he saw Star Wars while dressed as Darth Vader.

In 1981, his group promoted 20th Japanese SF convention (aka Daicon III), and he put "DAICON III Opening Animation" on the screen. Okada and Yasuhiro Takeda and their group established "Daicon Film" as an anime producing team and commissioned undergraduates of Osaka University of Arts to produce DAICON III and IV Opening Animations for the SF convention. Hideaki Anno, Takami Akai, and Hiroyuki Yamaga who were undergraduates of that university worked on those animations.

Okada realized that he could make a business out of selling SciFi products because he made a large profit selling Garage kits and videos of opening animations at this convention. In 1981, he was formally expelled from his university. On February 14, 1982, he opened "General Products" as a part of his parents company to sell SF Goods in Osaka. Before opening his shop, he borrowed money from his parents and got permission to use term of general products from Larry Niven. In this year, he got married.

Gainax
In 1986, he established Gainax as an Anime studio and isolated General Products from his parents company. Okada assumed office as CEO of Gainax and Yasuhiro Takeda assumed office as CEO of General Products. In 1989, Okada's first child was born, a daughter.In 1992, Okada retired from Gainax.

Works
Anime

Books

Video games

Movie

Career

References

  

External links
  
 
 
 
 
 
 Otaking Space Port: Toshio Okada On The Web 
 A Review of "You Otaku Are Already Dead"
 Return of the Otaking: Toshio Okada at Anime America '96 -(introduction)
 Part 2
 Part 3
 Part 4
 Part 5
 Part 6
 Part 7
 Part 8
 Part 9
 Part 10
 Part 11
 Part 12
 "Conscience of the Otaking" -(4-part 1995/1996 Animerica'' interview)

People from Osaka
Gainax
Living people
1958 births